Uroleptus lamella is a species of ciliates.

Description
The organism is green coloured, and is hairy. Just like Uroleptus musculus, it is U-shaped and has an elongated body with 3 frontals, and 2-4 rows of ventral cirri. It has no transverse cirri, and its "collar" can extend a short distance along right side of the body.

References

Species described in 1831
Spirotrichea
Taxa named by Christian Gottfried Ehrenberg